The 47th Venice Biennale, held in 1997, was an exhibition of international contemporary art, with 59 participating nations. The Venice Biennale takes place biennially in Venice, Italy. Prizewinners of the 47th Biennale included: Agnes Martin and Emilio Vedova (lifetime achievement), the French pavilion (best national participation), Marina Abramović and Gerhard Richter (International Prize), and Douglas Gordon, Pipilotti Rist, and Rachel Whiteread (best young artists).

Awards 

 Golden Lion for lifetime achievement: Agnes Martin and Emilio Vedova
 Golden Lion for best national participation: France (Fabrice Hyber)
 International Prize: Marina Abramović and Gerhard Richter
 Premio 2000 (young artists): Douglas Gordon, Pipilotti Rist, Rachel Whiteread
 Special awards: Thierry De Cordier, Marie-Ange Guilleminot, Ik-Joong Kang, Mariko Mori
 Premia (purchase) Cassa di Risparmio Foundation: Tobias Rehberger
 Premia giapponese Benesse: Alexandros Psychoulis
 Premia Illycaffè: Sam Taylor-Wood

References

Bibliography

Further reading 

 
 
 

1997 in art
1997 in Italy
Venice Biennale exhibitions